High Seas is a Spanish mystery series released on Netflix in May 2019. The program is set aboard a transatlantic ocean liner. It stars Ivana Baquero, Alejandra Onieva, Jon Kortajarena, Eloy Azorín, Chiqui Fernández, Tamar Novas, Daniel Lundh, Natalia Rodríguez, Laura Prats, Ignacio Montes, Begoña Vargas, and Manuela Vellés. The show was renewed for a second season in June 2019 and was released on November 22, 2019. Bambú Producciones is the production company behind the series. Actor Jon Kortajarena, who portrays character Nicolás Vázquez, confirmed season three of the show on his official Instagram page on November 6, 2019. A planned fourth season was cancelled by Netflix in mid-2020.

Plot
Following the death of their father, sisters Eva and Carolina Villanueva travel on the ocean liner, Bárbara de Braganza (formerly Covadonga), en route from Spain to Brazil in the late 1940s. They become embroiled in investigating mysterious on-board deaths, a secret microfilm, and hidden Nazi gold. The series starts with a mysterious woman called Luisa asking for help from the sisters, who smuggle her on board. Later Luisa is apparently thrown off the ship into the sea, and thus the investigation starts. It seems to finish quickly when someone confesses but their suicide in confinement is suspicious. Eventually the sisters' father proves to be alive, having been thought dead for the past two years. Complications continue as the sisters must choose who to believe – their father or their uncle – concerning the sending of people to concentration camps in trucks belonging to the family business. The true culprit is finally apprehended and Carolina gets married. But at the end of the first season, they receive a distress signal from a boat asking for help, and alter course to intercept.

Cast
 Ivana Baquero (dub: Nathalie Buscombe) as Eva Villanueva, a headstrong, curious young author, who becomes wrapped up in mysteries aboard the ship as she faces writer's block.
 Alejandra Onieva (dub: Bethan Rose Young) as Carolina Villanueva, Eva's timid, mature older sister and Fernando's fiancée (later wife).
 Jon Kortajarena (dub: Adam Rhys Dee) as Nicolás Vázquez, a suave officer aboard the Bárbara de Braganza, who helps Eva with her investigations.
 Eloy Azorín (dub: Daniel Flynn) as Fernando Fábregas, Carolina's fiancé and owner of the ship. He and Eva do not get along, after she accused him of having a gambling addiction.
 Manuela Vellés (dub: Tamaryn Payne) as Luisa Castro Bermúdez / Sofía Plazaola, a stowaway whom Eva sneaks onto the ship.
 Chiqui Fernández (dub: Julia Brams) as Francisca de García, the Villanueva sisters' stern maid (seasons 1-2).
 Begoña Vargas (dub: Jade Matthew) as Verónica de García, Francisca's shy daughter who becomes embroiled in a love triangle.
 José Sacristán (dub: David Shaw Parker) as Pedro Villanueva, Eva and Carolina's uncle.
 Natalia Rodríguez (dub: Amy Noble) as Natalia Fábregas, Fernando's sister.
 Antonio Durán (dub: Wayne Forester) as Detective Varela, the slimy head of the ship's security.
 Tamar Novas (dub: Dominic Tighe) as Sebastián de la Cuesta, a rich playboy who romances Verónica.
 Ignacio Montes (dub: Ben Elliot) as Dimas Gómez, Sebastián's servant who also romances Verónica.
 Eduardo Blanco (dub: Tim Bentinck) as Capitán Santiago Aguirre, the ship's captain.
 Pepe Ocio (dub: Stephen Hogan) as Doctor Rojas, the ship's doctor.
 Laura Prats (dub: Naomi McDonald) as Clara Romero (seasons 1-2), the ship's lounge singer and Pierre's girlfriend.
 Daniel Lundh (dub: John Hasler) as Pierre, an officer aboard the ship and Clara's boyfriend.
 Félix Gómez (dub: Daniel Weyman) as Aníbal de Souza (season 1), Natalia's husband who stalks and rapes Clara.
 Luis Bermejo (dub: Neil McCaul) as Carlos Villanueva/Mario Plazaola (seasons 1-2), Eva and Carolina's father and Luisa/Sofia's uncle. Initially believed to be deceased.

Season 2 
 Claudia Traisac (dub: Clare Corbett) as Casandra Lenormand, one of those rescued who appears to be a psychic, but seems to have a hidden agenda.
 Antonio Reyes (dub: Antony Byrne) as Erich, one of the rescues servant to Casandra
 Abel Rodríguez (dub: Ewan Goddard) as Simón, one of the rescues.
 Chiquinquirá Delgado as Teresa, one of the rescues.

Season 3 
 Marco Pigossi as Fábio, a British spy.
 Morgan Symes as Steve Taylor, head of the British investigation into Unterman's virus
 Cristina Plazas as Carmen, family friend of Pedro who has an alterior motive for being on the cruise
 Alejandra Onieva as Diana, Carmen's daughter initial pretending to be sick and mute
 Pep Anton Muñoz as Doctor Ayala, a shady doctor supposedly taking care of Diana
 Nicolás Francella as Héctor Birabent, takes over as first mate for Nicolás
 Claudia Galán as Chantel, Nicolás's wife
 Andrès López as Viktor Andonov, a violinist mistaken for a bioterrorist
 Itsaso Arana as Anna, a new maid  aboard the cruise

Recurring 
 Javier Taboada as Agustín, one of the receptionists.
 Gonzalo Kindelán as Arturo, a wealthy passenger on the ship and friend of Sebastián.
 Pepe Barroso as Julián, a third class passenger and skilled thief.

Episodes

Season 1 (2019)

Season 2 (2019)

Season 3 (2020)

Production
The original season was filmed in the winter of 2018. Season two of the series was confirmed by Netflix in June 2019 and filming took place in the middle of 2019. Season three of the series was renewed in November 2019 and filming began that same month. Season three aired on August 7, 2020.

English-language dubbing 
A strategy bringing a mixture of British accents was employed as an alternative to accent standardisation, including a Standard British English (SBE) accent for the upper-class characters, an anachronistic Estuary English for the younger lower-class women, and, vis-à-vis the lower-class male characters, a mix of a Standard British accent and a Cockney-coloured accent sported by those involved in criminal activities.

References

External links

Spanish-language Netflix original programming
2019 Spanish television series debuts
2020 Spanish television series endings
Television shows set in Rio de Janeiro (city)
Spanish mystery television series
Nautical television series
Television series set in the 1940s
2010s crime drama television series
2020s crime drama television series
2010s Spanish drama television series
2020s Spanish drama television series
Television series by Bambú Producciones

pt:Alta Mar (série de televisão)